Herman Stump Jr. (August 8, 1837 – January 9, 1917) was an American politician and lawyer. He is most notable for his service in the Maryland Senate and as a member of the United States House of Representatives.

Early life
Herman Stump Jr. was born on Oakington Farm in Harford County, Maryland, the son of John Wilson Stump and Sarah (née Biays) Stump. He was educated by private tutors and attended Delaware College. Stump studied law with his cousin Henry W. Archer, was admitted to the bar on November 11, 1856, and commenced practice in Bel Air.

Career
He became a noted trial attorney, and was notable for his representation of several female defendants in murder cases. He also became active in the Maryland Militia, and attained the rank of colonel. Stump purchased a Bel Air plantation called "Waverly", where he farmed and raised livestock.

Political career
Stump was elected to the Maryland State Senate in 1878 and served until 1880. He served as chairman of the state Democratic convention in 1879, and was the Senate's President pro tempore in 1880. He was defeated in the 1881 state senate election by Edward M. Allen.

In 1888, Stump was elected to the U.S. House of Representatives. He served in the 51st and 52nd Congresses (March 4, 1889 - March 3, 1893). He was not a candidate for re-nomination in 1892.

After the completion of his last term in Congress, Stump was appointed U.S. Superintendent of Immigration by President Grover Cleveland and served from April 8, 1893, to July 16, 1897.

Later life
Stump practiced law in Bel Air until retiring in 1902, after which he continued to reside at Waverly.

Personal life
In 1903, Stump married Mary Fernandez de Velasco (1853-1944) of New York City.  They had no children.

Stump died at Waverly on January 9, 1917, and was interred in St. Mary's Cemetery in Emmorton, Maryland.

References

Sources

Books

Other

External links

Maryland State Archives: Herman Stump, Jr.

Herman Stump at The Political Graveyard

1837 births
1917 deaths
Democratic Party Maryland state senators
People from Harford County, Maryland
People from Bel Air, Maryland
Presidents of the Maryland State Senate
Democratic Party members of the United States House of Representatives from Maryland
19th-century American politicians
Maryland lawyers